Labanoras Forest also the Labanoras–Pabradė Forest,  is the second-largest forest in Lithuania. A large part of the forest is protected by the Labanoras Regional Park and the Aukštaitija National Park.

The Labanoras Forest mainly consists of pine trees. There are some birch, spruce, black alder groves. Soils are sandy, light, densely covered by cup lichen. The forest is rich in edible mushrooms, billberries, cranberries, and cowberries. Collection of these mushrooms and berries are an important part of the local economy. The fauna includes many endangered species, such as the gray wolf, wood grouse, black grouse, hoopoe, Eurasian eagle-owl, osprey, mountain hare, stoat, Coronella austriaca, great capricorn beetle, and Lucanus cervus.

References 

Forests of Lithuania
Utena County
Vilnius County